Tales and Fantasies is a short story collection by Robert Louis Stevenson. The book was published posthumously in 1905. It contains three stories, which were not published as a part of a collection during Stevenson′s lifetime:
 "The Misadventures of John Nicholson: A Christmas Story" (1885–87). First published in Yule Tide, 1887, later in the Edinburgh Edition, 1897.
 "The Body Snatcher" (1881). First published in the Christmas 1884 edition of the Pall Mall Gazette, later in the Edinburgh Edition, 1895.
 "The Story of a Lie" (1879). First published in New Quarterly Magazine in 1879; later in The Novels and Tales of Robert Louis Stevenson, vol 3, 1895.

References

External links
 Full text on Project Gutenberg

Books published posthumously
Short story collections by Robert Louis Stevenson
1905 short story collections